Forever Lazy is an apparel company and brand of clothing headquartered in Milwaukee, Wisconsin.

History
Forever Lazy was created by two friends from Wisconsin – Dave Hibler and Tyler Galganski. The idea behind the brand originated in early 2009 and Forever Lazy LLC was founded June 1, 2009. The prototype, samples, and first production runs were completed by Seymour Jaron, of SJ Manufacturing in San Francisco, CA. The pajamas, known first as the Uni-Lazy, went on sale August 29, 2009. In 2010, Dave and Tyler became finalists for Businessweek's America's Best Young Entrepreneurs.

In  December 2010 Forever Lazy entered into an infomercial partnership with Allstar Products Group. The Forever Lazy infomercial campaign and retail placement lasted through the Winter of 2012.

Media appearance
 The Colbert Report
 The Tonight Show with Jay Leno
 Chelsea Lately
 Kathy Griffin
 Conan (talk show)
 The Doctors (2008 TV series)
 TruTV
 Today Show (2010)
 Today Show (2011)
 Happening Now

References

External links
Forever Lazy website

2009 establishments in Wisconsin
Clothing brands
Companies based in Milwaukee
American companies established in 2009
Retail companies established in 2009
Clothing companies established in 2009